Shraddha TV is a non-profit Buddhist television channel based in Sri Lanka. The channel is known for airing religious spiritual content with a primary focus on Buddhism and the teaching of Buddha. Most of the programming is shot at the main Buddhist monastery in Polgahawela.

Shraddha TV was officially launched on 29 September 2012 on the cable television service, PEO TV. It was subsequently included on the home satellite television service, Dialog TV. The founder of television channel is Kiribathgoda Gnanananda Thero, who is also the founder of Mahamevnawa Buddhist Monastery. The chairperson of Shraddha TV is Roshini Rajapaksa.

The channel is owned by the Mahamevnawa Buddhist Monastery and is broadcast from Kaduwela, a suburb of Colombo. Shraddha stands for devotion. It uses content from real life and advertises itself as being suitable for people of all ages and religious persuasions.  It broadcasts Dhamma Sermons, Dhamma Discussions, Meditation Guides, documentaries, and Charity Services 24 hours a day via Dialog TV Channel No 27 and SLT Peo TV Channel No 99. Its main tagline is "The Noble friend of Television Media". Shraddha TV started terrestrial broadcasting for the Western province via UHF 55 on 2015-12-31.

The channel frequently discusses the "Fundamentals of Buddhist Teachings", such as the Four Noble Truths, Noble Eightfold Path, Pratītyasamutpāda, Skandha - Five Aggregates of Clinging, etc.

In 2020, Shradda TV dubbed a Thai film Love over 3D into Sinhala version titled Biyakaruya Me Sasara.

Programmes

See also
 Global Buddhist Network
 The Buddhist (TV channel)
 Lord Buddha TV
 Buddhist Publication Society & Pariyatti (bookstore)
 Buddhist Cultural Centre
 Access to Insight

References

External links
  Shraddha TV Official Website

Sinhala-language television stations
Buddhist television
Religious television channels in Sri Lanka
Television channels and stations established in 2012